Syllidae, commonly known as the necklace worms, is a family of small to medium-sized polychaete worms. Syllids are distinguished from other polychaetes by the presence of a muscular region of the anterior digestive tract known as the proventricle.

Most syllids are benthic organisms that transition to a pelagic epitoke for reproduction. They are found in all regions of the ocean, from the intertidal zone to the deep sea, and are especially abundant in shallow water.

They are found in a range of habitats, moving actively on rock and sandy substrates, hiding in crevices and among seaweeds, and climbing on sponges, corals, hydrozoans, seagrasses and mangroves. They are generalist feeders. A young Syllid was one of the first worms to be found with pollen from seagrass in its stomach, making it a possible pollinator.

The proventricle, Syllid worm's most distinctive anatomical feature, allows the worm to feed by sucking due to its pumping action. It also plays a role in hormone production, and thus the worm's sexual development. The proventricle is composed of strirated muscle cells with the longest known sacromeres among animals. The proventricle is usually visible through the body wall.

Syllis ramosa was the first polychaete discovered to have a branching body plan. Later, two species of Ramisyllis were discovered to have a branching body plan.

Subfamilies 
 Anoplosyllinae
 Autolytinae
 Eusyllinae
 Exogoninae
 Syllinae
 Syllis
Syllis aciculigrossa (San Martín, 1990)
 Syllis adamantea (Treadwell, 1914)
 Syllis albae Álvarez-Campos & Verdes, 2017
 Syllis albanyensis (Hartmann-Schröder, 1984)
 Syllis alosae San Martín, 1992
 Syllis alternata Moore, 1908
 Syllis amica Quatrefages, 1866
 Syllis amicarmillaris Simon, San Martín & Robinson, 2014
 Syllis anoculata (Hartmann-Schröder, 1962)
 Syllis antoniae Salcedo Oropeza, San Martín & Solís-Weiss, 2012
 Syllis armillaris (O.F. Müller, 1776)
 Syllis augeneri Haswell, 1920
 Syllis barbata San Martín, 1992
 Syllis bella Chamberlin, 1919
 Syllis beneliahuae (Campoy & Alquézar, 1982)
 Syllis benguellana Day, 1963
 Syllis boggemanni San Martín, Álvarez-Campos & Hutchings, 2017
 Syllis botosaneanui (Hartmann-Schröder, 1973)
 Syllis brasiliensis McIntosh, 1885
 Syllis breviarticulata Grube, 1857
 Syllis brevicirrata McIntosh, 1908
 Syllis brevicirris Hansen, 1882
 Syllis broomensis (Hartmann-Schröder, 1979)
 Syllis caeca Monro, 1933
 Syllis castroviejoi Capa, San Martín & López, 2001
 Syllis cerina Grube, 1878
 Syllis cirrita Lee & Rho, 1994
 Syllis columbretensis (Campoy, 1982)
 Syllis compacta Gravier, 1900
 Syllis corallicola Verrill, 1900
 Syllis cornuta Rathke, 1843
 Syllis crassicirrata (Treadwell, 1925)
 Syllis cruzi Núñez & San Martín, 1991
 Syllis curticirris Monro, 1937
 Syllis danieli San Martín, 1992
 Syllis deleoni Salcedo Oropeza, San Martín & Solís-Weiss, 2012
 Syllis edensis (Hartmann-Schröder, 1989)
 Syllis elongata (Johnson, 1901)
 Syllis ergeni Çinar, 2005
 Syllis erikae (Hartmann-Schröder, 1981)
 Syllis fasciata Malmgren, 1867
 Syllis ferrani Alós & San Martín, 1987
 Syllis filidentata (Hartmann-Schröder, 1962)
 Syllis garciai (Campoy, 1982)
 Syllis gerlachi (Hartmann-Schröder, 1960)
 Syllis gerundensis (Alós & Campoy, 1981)
 Syllis glandulata Nogueira & San Martín, 2002
 Syllis glarearia (Westheide, 1974)
 Syllis golfonovensis (Hartmann-Schröder, 1962)
 Syllis gracilis Grube, 1840
 Syllis guidae Nogueira & Yunda-Guarin, 2008
 Syllis heterochaeta Moore, 1909
 Syllis hyalina Grube, 1863
 Syllis hyllebergi (Licher, 1999)
 Syllis joaoi San Martín, Álvarez-Campos & Hutchings, 2017
 Syllis jorgei San Martín & López, 2000
 Syllis kabilica Ben-Eliahu, 1977
 Syllis karlae San Martín, Álvarez-Campos & Hutchings, 2017
 Syllis kas Lucas, Sikorski & San Martín, 2018
 Syllis komodoensis Aguado, San Martín & ten Hove, 2008
 Syllis krohnii Ehlers, 1864
 Syllis lagunae Tovar-Hernández, Hernández-Alcántara & Solís-Weiss, 2008
 Syllis latifrons Grube, 1857
 Syllis licheri Ravara, San Martín & Moreira, 2004
 Syllis limbata Grube, 1880
 Syllis longesegmentata Grube, 1857
 Syllis lunaris (Imajima, 1966)
 Syllis lutea (Hartmann-Schröder, 1960)
 Syllis luteoides (Hartmann-Schröder, 1962)
 Syllis macroceras Grube, 1857
 Syllis macrodentata (Hartmann-Schröder, 1982)
 Syllis magdalena Wesenberg-Lund, 1962
 Syllis magnapalpa (Hartmann-Schröder, 1965)
 Syllis marceloi San Martín, Álvarez-Campos & Hutchings, 2017
 Syllis marugani Aguado, San Martín & Nishi, 2006
 Syllis maryae San Martín, 1992
 Syllis mauretanica (Licher, 1999)
 Syllis mayeri Musco & Giangrande, 2005
 Syllis mercedesae Lucas, San Martín & Parapar, 2012
 Syllis mexicana (Rioja, 1960)
 Syllis microoculata (Hartmann-Schröder, 1965)
 Syllis monilaris Savigny in Lamarck, 1818
 Syllis mytilorum Studer, 1889
 Syllis nigra Augener, 1925
 Syllis nigrescens Grube, 1878
 Syllis nigricirris Grube, 1863
 Syllis nigriscens Grube, 1878
 Syllis nigropunctata Haswell, 1886
 Syllis notocera Ehlers, 1905
 Syllis nuchalis (Hartmann-Schröder, 1960)
 Syllis obscura Grube, 1857
 Syllis onkylochaeta Hartmann-Schröder, 1991
 Syllis ortizi San Martín, 1992
 Syllis parapari San Martín & López, 2000
 Syllis parturiens Haswell, 1920
 Syllis pectinans Haswell, 1920
 Syllis picta (Kinberg, 1866)
 Syllis pigmentata (Chamberlin, 1919)
 Syllis pilosa Aguado, San Martín & Nishi, 2008
 Syllis pontxioi San Martín & López, 2000
 Syllis profunda Cognetti, 1955
 Syllis prolifera Krohn, 1852
 Syllis prolixa Ehlers, 1901
 Syllis pseudoarmillaris Nogueira & San Martín, 2002
 Syllis pulvinata (Langerhans, 1881)
 Syllis quadrifasciata Fischli, 1900
 Syllis quaternaria Moore, 1906
 Syllis ramosa McIntosh, 1879
 Syllis riojai (San Martín, 1990)
 Syllis robertianae McIntosh, 1885
 Syllis rosea (Langerhans, 1879)
 Syllis rubicunda Aguado, San Martín & Nishi, 2008
 Syllis rudolphi Delle Chiaje, 1841
 Syllis schulzi (Hartmann-Schröder, 1960)
 Syllis sclerolaema Ehlers, 1901
 Syllis setoensis (Imajima, 1966)
 Syllis sol San Martín, 2004
 Syllis stenura Blanchard in Gay, 1849
 Syllis tamarae Álvarez-Campos & Verdes, 2017
 Syllis tiedemanni Delle Chiaje, 1841
 Syllis torquata Marion & Bobretzky, 1875
 Syllis tripantu Álvarez-Campos & Verdes, 2017
 Syllis truncata Haswell, 1920
 Syllis tyrrhena (Licher & Kuper, 1998)
 Syllis umbricolor Grube, 1878
 Syllis unzima Simon, San Martín & Robinson, 2014
 Syllis valida Grube, 1857
 Syllis variegata Grube, 1860
 Syllis villenai Aguado, San Martín & ten Hove, 2008
 Syllis violacea Grube, 1870
 Syllis vittata Grube, 1840
 Syllis vivipara Krohn, 1869
 Syllis warrnamboolensis (Hartmann-Schröder, 1987)
 Syllis westheidei San Martín, 1984
 Syllis yallingupensis (Hartmann-Schröder, 1982)
 Syllis ypsiloides Aguado, San Martín & ten Hove, 2008
 Ramisyllis 
 Ramisyllis multicaudata Glasby, Schroeder & Aguado, 2012
 Ramisyllis kingghidorahi M. Teresa Aguado, et al. 2022

References

External links

 
Annelid families